The Admiralty Embankment ( (Admiralteyskaya Naberezhnaya)) or Admiralty Quay is a street along the Neva River in Central Saint Petersburg, named after the Admiralty Board.
Between 1919 and 1944 the street was known as Roshal Embankment, named after  the  revolutionary S. G. Roshal.

The Admiralty Embankment was constructed in 1763 to 1767, by the engineers V. M. Karlowicz and S. S. Selyavionov. The street has no other buildings than the Admiralty and the Bronze Horseman.

The street begins at the Decembrists Square, where the English Embankment becomes the Admiralty Embankment. The street ends at the Palace Bridge, where it becomes the Palace Embankment.

The Admiralty Embankment is home to the Admiralty building and the Bronze Horseman, it has also a wonderful view of the Neva and the Saint Petersburg State University is just across the Neva.

See also

Lions at the Dvortsovaya pier

Streets in Saint Petersburg
Cultural heritage monuments of federal significance in Saint Petersburg